Mirbelia stipitata is a species of flowering plant in the family Fabaceae and is endemic to inland areas of Western Australia. It is a spiny, more or less leafless shrub with yellow and red flowers.

Description

Taxonomy
Mirbelia stipitata was first formally described in 1987 by Michael Crisp and Joan M. Taylor in the Journal of the Adelaide Botanic Gardens from specimens collected by Paul Graham Wilson near Laverton in 1968. The specific epithet (stipitata) means "stalked", referring to the ovary.

Distribution
This mirbelia is only known from two collections in the Murchison bioregion of inland Western Australia.

Conservation status
Mirbelia stipitata is listed as "Priority Three" by the Government of Western Australia Department of Biodiversity, Conservation and Attractions, meaning that it is poorly known and known from only a few locations but is not under imminent threat.

References

Flora of Western Australia
Plants described in 1987
stipitata
Taxa named by Michael Crisp